Ali Lacin (born 17 April 1988) is a German Paralympic athlete competing in T61-classification events. He won the bronze medal in the men's 200 metres T61 event at the 2020 Summer Paralympics held in Tokyo, Japan.

Career 

Lacin competes as a T61-classified athlete, a class specifically for athletes with double above the knee amputation.

In 2019, he won the bronze medal in the men's 200 metres T61 event at the World Para Athletics Championships held in Dubai, United Arab Emirates. For winning a bronze medal at the Summer Paralympics (200 m race), he was awarded on 8 November 2021 the Silver Laural leaf by the President of the Federal Republic of Germany.

Achievements

References

External links 
 
 

1988 births
Living people
German male long jumpers
German male sprinters
German amputees
Paralympic athletes of Germany
Paralympic bronze medalists for Germany
Paralympic medalists in athletics (track and field)
Athletes (track and field) at the 2020 Summer Paralympics
Medalists at the 2020 Summer Paralympics
Recipients of the Silver Laurel Leaf
Medalists at the World Para Athletics Championships
Medalists at the World Para Athletics European Championships
Athletes from Berlin
20th-century German people
21st-century German people